The Schindelkopf in the Harz Mountains of central Germany is a southwestern outlier of the mountain ridge known as Auf dem Acker (865.1 m). It is located near the town of Osterode am Harz within the unincorporated area of Harz which is in the district of Göttingen in the state of Lower Saxony.

Location 
The Schindelkopf lies in the Upper Harz within the Harz Nature Park. It rises between the southwestern end of the main Acker crest in the east and the town of Osterode am Harz in the west. Towards the north-northeast the countryside falls away through the valley of Schachttal to the eastern end of the Söse Reservoir with its pre-basin. To the south-southwest it descends through the valley of the Kleine Steinau, which has its source on the mountains, to the Sieber valley, and, to the west-northwest, it descends along the Eipenke, which also rises on the mountainside, into the valley of the Söse. The Große Schweimke rises a little southwest of the mountain; it is fed by the Kleine Schweimke and is a tributary of the Kleiner Steinau.

Hiking 
The Schindelkopf can only be reached on forest tracks. On its northwestern flank stands a Köte (ca. ; ), which is checkpoint no. 143 in the Harzer Wandernadel hiking system.

References 

Mountains of Lower Saxony
Mountains of the Harz
Mountains under 1000 metres
Göttingen (district)